MID or Mid may refer to:

Computers and electronics
 MapInfo Interchange Format; .mid is also sometimes used as the filename extension for some MapInfo files
 Media Identification Code (MID code), a code indicating the manufacturer of a DVD
 Mobile Internet device, a category of mobile computer
 Molded interconnect device, an injection molded thermoplastic part with integrated electronic circuit traces
 Multiple interface declaration, a construct in some computer programming languages
 Musical Instrument Digital Interface, .mid is sometimes used as an alternate filename extension for MIDI files

Medicine and biology
 Multi-infarct dementia, a disease also known as vascular dementia
 Minimal important difference, the smallest improvement felt to be meaningful by a patient
 Monocyte, a type of white blood cell in the innate immune system of vertebrates

Military
 Maritime identification digits, a 3-digit code identifying the country of a ship/coastal station using communication equipment.
 Mentioned in dispatches, a military award for gallantry or otherwise commendable service
 Militarized interstate dispute, conflicts between states that do not involve full-scale wars
 Military Intelligence Division (United States), a former military intelligence branch of the United States Army

Other
 Integration and Development Movement, a political party in Argentina
 Mérida International Airport (IATA: MID)
 Middletown station (Pennsylvania) (Amtrak station code: MID)
 Modesto Irrigation District, a special district in California
 Mortgage interest deduction, a tax deduction for mortgage interest paid by homeowners
 Measuring Instruments Directive
 Mid vowel
 Midfielder, a position in association football
 Ministry of Foreign Affairs (Russia), for which MID is a colloquial term

See also
 MIDS (disambiguation)